The Vigiljoch (Italian: Monte San Vigilio) is a mountain pass (also standing for the nearby mountain) near Lana in South Tyrol, Italy. The pass is at elevation 1,743 m, whereas the nearby summits northeast of the pass (Larchbichl, Bischofskofel, Marlinger Joch) are insignificantly higher.

References 
 Mount vigilio Lana Tyrol
 Alpenverein South Tyrol 
 Oswald Stimpfl: Erlebnis Vigiljoch. Wandern, Ski fahren, einkehren, Kultur erleben. Wien / Bozen: Folio Verlag 2008.

External links 

Mountains of the Alps
Mountains of South Tyrol
Mountain passes of South Tyrol